Chris or Christopher Sims may refer to:

 Christopher A. Sims, American macroeconomist
 Chris Sims (police officer), British Chief Constable
 Chris Sims (priest) (born 1949), Anglican priest
 Chris Whitey Sims (born 1966), musician and songwriter

See also 
 Chris Simms (disambiguation)